Malicious caller identification, introduced in 1992 as Call Trace, is activated by Vertical service code Star codes *57, and is an upcharge fee subscription service offered by telephone company providers which, when dialed immediately after a malicious call, records meta-data for police follow-up. A police report must be filed after each use, as law enforcement will only act on the trace once a formal police report is filed in regard to the call.

Malicious caller identification facility, also called malicious call trace or caller-activated malicious call trace, when subscribed or enabled, works by allowing a phone call recipient to mark or flag the preceding phone call connection as malicious (i.e. harassing, threatening, obscene, etc.). The phone system will then automatically trace the call by flagging station to station billing and routing data including start and end times. The call trace is not dependent upon call duration (as envisioned in dramatic movie plots) and will record all meta-data regardless of source conditions - even if the call was made from an unlisted number, a payphone or a number with caller identification disabled. To protect privacy the resulting trace data is only made available to law enforcement.

How the user activates this feature depends on their phone system — generally it is either in-band-signaling DTMF sequence such as the *57 Vertical service code or a special button attached to their phone generating an out-of-band signal. For analogue services, many exchanges will interpret DTMF sequences to activate POTS. Digital services, such as ISDN or GSM, enable the CPE to activate MCI via out-of-band signaling. Often with PABXs with analogue phone connections, the PABX will interpret the DTMF and then activate the out-of-band signaling.

MCI is the ETSI standard, whereas MCT is the American one. They both do more or less the same thing though.

In Canada, the service is usually marketed as call trace, and fees generally only apply when the service is used.

See also

References

External links
 Archive of Call Trace Recordings

Telephone service enhanced features